Khagrachhari is a constituency of the Jatiya Sangsad (National Parliament) of Bangladesh, represented, since 2014, by Kujendra Lal Tripura of the Awami League.

Boundaries 
The constituency consists of the entirety of the Khagrachhari Hill District.

Members of Parliament

Elections

Elections in the 2010s

References

Parliamentary constituencies in Bangladesh
Khagrachhari District